Lake Léré is a lake in the Mayo-Kebbi Ouest Region in southwestern Chad about 6 km east of the border with Cameroon. It is fed by the Mayo Kébbi that leaves near Léré  the smaller Lake Tréné.

References

External links 
 http://www.geonames.org/2429157/lac-de-lere.html

Lakes of Chad
Lakes of Africa